Komsomolskoye Urban Settlement is the name of several municipal formations in Russia.
Komsomolskoye Urban Settlement, a municipal formation which the town of Komsomolsk in Komsomolsky District of Ivanovo Oblast is incorporated as
Komsomolskoye Urban Settlement, a municipal formation which the Urban-Type Settlement of Komsomolsk in Tisulsky District of Kemerovo Oblast is incorporated as
Komsomolskoye Urban Settlement, a municipal formation which the Work Settlement of Komsomolsky in Chamzinsky District of the Republic of Mordovia is incorporated as

See also
Komsomolsky (disambiguation)

References

Notes

Sources

